Aleksei Borisovich Yeryomenko (born 17 January 1964), also known as Alexei Eremenko Sr. is a Russian professional football manager and a former player who also holds Finnish citizenship.

Playing career
Yeryomenko made his debut in the Soviet Top League in 1981 for FC SKA Rostov-on-Don.

Managerial career
Yeryomenko was the manager of the Finnish club FF Jaro between August 2009 and June 2016. On 4 August 2016, Yeryomenko was appointed as manager of Kazakhstan Premier League side Shakhter Karagandy, being fired on 29 May 2017.
On 8 August 2017, Yeryomenko signed a one-year contract with Armenian side FC Pyunik, but left the club on 31 October 2017.
On 22 May 2018, SJK announced that Yeryomenko had replaced Tommi Kautonen as their manager after their poor start to the season.
On 11 February 2020, FK Spartaks announced that Yeryomenko had been signed as their new manager.

Personal life
He is the father and agent of Alexei Eremenko, Roman Eremenko and Sergei Eremenko.

European club competition appearances
 UEFA Cup 1986–87 with FC Spartak Moscow: 6 games.
 UEFA Intertoto Cup 1996 with FF Jaro: 4 games.
 UEFA Cup 1999-00 with HJK.
 UEFA Cup 2000-01 with HJK.
 UEFA Cup 2001-02 with HJK.
 UEFA Cup 2002-03 with HJK.

References

1964 births
People from Novocherkassk
Living people
Soviet footballers
Association football midfielders
Russian footballers
Russian football managers
FF Jaro managers
Russian people of Ukrainian descent
FC Rostov players
FC SKA Rostov-on-Don players
FC Spartak Moscow players
FC Torpedo Moscow players
FC Dynamo Moscow players
FF Jaro players
Athinaikos F.C. players
Tromsø IL players
Helsingin Jalkapalloklubi players
Soviet Top League players
Russian Premier League players
Veikkausliiga players
Eliteserien players
Russian expatriate footballers
Expatriate footballers in Greece
Expatriate footballers in Finland
Expatriate footballers in Norway
Finnish people of Russian descent
Russian expatriate football managers
Expatriate football managers in Kazakhstan
FC Shakhter Karagandy managers
Expatriate football managers in Armenia
FC Pyunik managers
Soviet emigrants to Finland
Jakobstads BK players
Oulun Luistinseura players
Expatriate football managers in Latvia
Naturalized citizens of Finland
Russian-speaking Finns
Sportspeople from Rostov Oblast
Expatriate football managers in Estonia